Santa Catalina, officially the Municipality of Santa Catalina, is a 1st class municipality in the province of Negros Oriental, Philippines. According to the 2020 census, it has a population of 77,501 people.

The town is home to the Minagahat language, the indigenous language of Southern Negros as listed by the Komisyon sa Wikang Filipino. The language is vital to the culture and arts of the people.

Etymology
The town of Santa Catalina got its name after the supposedly miraculous image of the patron saint, Santa Catalina de Alejandria, installed in the community chapel.

History
Spanish Regime
The town of Santa Catalina was formerly named Tolong. In about 1572, Captain Miguel de Laorca, a member of Legaspi's expedition, sent the first Spanish mission led by Adrien Lajot, a Belgian mercenary (from Provence Liège) in order to take possession of Negros Island. During that period, there existed settlements at Lunsod (now Daan Lunsod), Secopan (now Secopong), and Cawitan ruled by three chieftains. It was said that these warring chieftains were settled and amicably fused by the Spaniards as a single settlement at Daan Lunsod. In the process of settling, the Spaniards referred to the chieftains as “Kamo Tolon”, (a mispronounced phrase for “Kamo Tolo” which means “The Three of You”). Hence, the name TOLON, and then eventually TOLONG.

Santa Catalina Parish Church
According to the Definatorio of June 11, 1580, the beginning of the Christian Organization of Negros Island was due to the Augustinian Friars. Because of the lack of priests, the secular priest of the Diocese of Cebu undertook the spiritual administration of Negros Island. He placed Dumaguete, Siaton, Marabao (now Bacong), and Manalongon (the name of the river) under the Ministry of Tanjay. In 1751, Tolong and the settlements further down south were taken over by the Recollect Friars because of the distance and difficulty of transportation.

Before 1855, the Recollect Friars who took over the mission of Tolong constructed a convent, a church, a cemetery, and a Tribunal House. The church was built of light materials but the convent and the Tribunal House were made of lime and limestone. In that same period, the poblacion of Tolong was moved and resettled from the old site, Daan Lunsod, to a site further down the coast where the church was built, the present location of Santa Catalina. Even today, a famous landmark can be seen in the form of a balete tree growing on what was left of a portion of a wall of the old Tribunal House, right in the heart of Santa Catalina, which has become a symbol of the town.

An adjacent town, Bayawan, became formally organized in the year 1872.

The occupation of Negros Island increased rapidly, and agriculture progressed in an inconceivable manner. The Spanish government, in order to attain better administration, formed and organized the Province of Negros Oriental in the year 1890, completely independent from the Occidental, Dumaguete was made capital of Negros Oriental and Tolong was next to the last town in the south to be within the Province of Negros Oriental.

American Regime
In the new regime of the American occupation, sometime in the year 1903, the Poblacion of Tolong and Bayawan could not meet the minimum requirement to qualify for a municipality. So the two poblacions were fused together making Bayawan as the main Municipality, calling it Tolong Nuevo, and Tolong was reduced to be a mere Barrio called Tolong Viejo.

Japanese Regime
When World War II broke out, the Japanese occupied Dumaguete on May 26, 1942. Since Tolong was the headquarters of the Guerrilla Movement under the leadership of Col. Abside with Lt. Gonzalo Melodia and some of his Tolong Viejo defenders, the Japanese visited the place with caution, landing only at dawn and back to Dumaguete in the afternoon. The recognized guerrilla unit was aided by local soldiers of the Philippine Commonwealth Army military units engage to encounter by attacking Japanese troops at Santa Catalina from 1942 to 1945 until retreating of all guerrilla fighters from the enemy hands. The province was liberated on April 26, 1945, by the combined forces of the United States Army, Philippine Commonwealth Army, Philippine Constabulary and the Recognized Guerrillas.

Post World War II
After the war, in 1945, Congressman Enrique Medina, who considered himself as a son of Tolong Viejo, sponsored a move to separate Tolong Viejo from Tolong Nuevo.

On December 17, 1947, President Manuel Roxas issued executive order No. 111, making Santa Catalina (previously Tolong Nuevo) the 26th municipality of Negros Oriental. After which, Tolong Nuevo immediately passed a resolution to rename their municipality Bayawan reviving the former name. Hence, the name TOLONG immediately disappeared.

Geography
The topography of Santa Catalina is predominantly slightly rolling hills (70% of its area), 25% is flat, and the remainder is steep terrain. There are 8 rivers and 27 springs.

Climate

Dry season: November to April
Wet season: May to September
Average temperature:

Barangays
Santa Catalina is politically subdivided into 22 barangays.

Demographics

Economy

Education

Public Elementary Schools - Santa Catalina North 1

Public Elementary Schools - Santa Catalina North 2

Public Elementary Schools - Santa Catalina South

Public High Schools

Government

List of former chief executives
The former mayors of Santa Catalina are:
 1948–1951:     Telesforo Belloso (First Appointed Mayor)
 1951–1968:     Herminio T. Electona (first elected Mayor)
 1968–1971:     Jose N. Napigkit
 1971–1980:     Herminio T. Electona
 1980–1986:     Jose N. Napigkit
 1986–1987:     Herminio T. Electona 
 1987–1998:     Jose N. Napigkit(Appointed OIC Mayor) 
 1998–2007:     Leon M. Lopez
 2007–2010:     Ruben O. Melodia
 2010–2013:     Leon M. Lopez
 2013–2018:     Nataniel Electona
 2018–2019:     Nelson C. Lopez
 2019–Present:  Peve O. Ligan

References

External links

 [ Philippine Standard Geographic Code]
Philippine Census Information
Local Governance Performance Management System

Municipalities of Negros Oriental
Establishments by Philippine executive order